The women's 100 metre freestyle was a swimming event held as part of the swimming at the 1920 Summer Olympics programme. It was the second appearance of the event, which was one of the two women's events held in 1912.

A total of 19 swimmers from nine nations competed in the event, which was held on Monday, August 23 and on Wednesday, August 25, 1920.

Records

These were the standing world and Olympic records (in minutes) prior to the 1920 Summer Olympics.

Frances Schroth broke the Olympic record in the first semifinal with a time of 1 minute 18.0 seconds. Ethelda Bleibtrey broke the world record in the third semifinal with 1 minute 14.4 seconds and lowered her own new record again in the final with 1 minute 13.6 seconds.

Results

Semifinals

Monday, August 23, 1920: The fastest two in each semi-final and the fastest third-placed from across the semi-finals advanced.

Semifinal 1

Semifinal 2

Semifinal 3

Final

Wednesday, August 25, 1920:

References

Notes
 
 

Swimming at the 1920 Summer Olympics
1920 in women's swimming
Swim